Osney Mill Marina (aka Osney Marina) is a private marina on a branch off the River Thames in Oxford, England. It is located south from the Botley Road down Mill Street and close to the site of Osney Abbey and Oxford railway station to the north.

The marina is located on a 500m long island created in the Middle Ages to provide water for Osney Mill to the north, now disused. Access to the Thames is at the southern end of the marina.

To the northeast is Osney Cemetery.
Also to the north is Osney Lock.

References

External links
 Osney Mill Marina website

Parks and open spaces in Oxford
Marinas in England
Islands of the River Thames